Mwata or Muata may refer to the following people
Mwata Bowden (born 1947), American jazz reeds player 
Mwata "Gotti" Mitchell, American rapper; member of Boo & Gotti
Mwata Yamvo, 16th-century ruler of the Lunda Kingdom in the Democratic Republic of Congo
Themba Muata-Marlow (born 1994), Australian/English footballer of Jamaican ancestry